Elvira Menéndez (Portuguese and Galician: Elvira Mendes; died between 20 February and 12 October 921) was Queen consort of León due to her marriage with King Ordoño II.

Biography 
Elvira was the daughter of Hermenegildo Gutiérrez, a Galician noble, count in Tuy and Oporto, who was responsible for the reconquest of Coimbra, and his wife Ermesenda Gatónez.  Around 892, Elvira married Infante Ordoño, the son of King Alfonso III of Asturias, who first ruled as King of Galicia and later of León after the death of his brother García I in 914. Elvira confirmed numerous charters with her husband, many of these being privileges and donations to Galician nobles and religious establishments, especially to the Cathedral of Santiago de Compostela.

Elvira died between 20 February and 12 October 921.   According to the chronicle of Sampiro, when King Ordoño received the news of her death upon his return from a successful campaign against the Moors in Zamora, "...the pain was as great as the joy for his triumph".  She was buried in the Pantheon of Asturian Kings in the Cathedral of San Salvador in Oviedo.

Issue 
From her marriage with King Ordoño she had the following children:
 Sancho Ordóñez, King of Galicia;
 Alfonso IV;  King of León;
 Ramiro II,  King of León after the abdication of his brother Alfonso;
 Jimena Ordóñez (died after 935); 
 García Ordóñez (died after 934).

References

Bibliography 
  
 

921 deaths
Leonese queen consorts
Galician queens consort
10th-century Portuguese people
10th-century Portuguese women
10th-century people from the Kingdom of León
10th-century Spanish women
10th-century Visigothic people